Seo Hee Ham (born ), written Ham Seo-Hee in Korean order, is a South Korean professional mixed martial artist and kickboxer. She is currently signed to ONE Championship, where she is ranked #2 in the ONE Championship Women's Atomweight rankings.

Ham previously competed in the MMA promotions Deep, Smackgirl, Jewels, Road FC,  UFC, and Rizin. She is a former Jewels Atomweight Champion, former Road FC Women's Atomweight Champion, and former Rizin Women's Super Atomweight Champion.

Early life
She started training in kickboxing in 2004.

With few female fighters to train with in South Korea, Ham regularly trains with male fighters, such as fellow gym member Dong Hyun Kim. She is nicknamed "Hamderlei Silva" because of the similarities between her fighting style and Wanderlei Silva's style. In Japan, she is occasionally nicknamed "Arale-chan", in reference to her looks outside of the ring bearing resemblance to the character Arale Norimaki from the manga series Dr. Slump. Currently, Ham uses "Hamzzang" as her official nickname.

Mixed martial arts career

Japan

On  at Smackgirl 7th anniversary: Starting Over, Ham challenged Smackgirl Lightweight Champion Yuka Tsuji for her title, losing by unanimous decision in a match that Tsuji completely dominated. On , Ham participated in the Smackgirl World ReMix Tournament 2008 Opening Round, where she defeated Saori Ishioka by unanimous decision.

Ham was slated to compete at Jewels 10th Ring, but since she decided to participate in two kickboxing matches with conflicting dates, Jewels released her. Jewels later announced that she would still participate in the semi-finals of the Lightweight Queen Tournament at Jewels 11th Ring. Ham faced Mika Nagano in the semi-finals and defeated Nagano by split decision. In the tournament final later that night, Ham was defeated by Ayaka Hamasaki via unanimous decision. She once again defeated Ishioka by unanimous decision. On , Ham faced Anna Saito in a mixed martial arts rules match at Gladiator 15: GI 2. Ham defeated Saito by unanimous decision. She defeated Yamaguchi by unanimous decision. She was defeated by TKO (corner stoppage) after the first round when she could not continue due to injury. On , Ham faced pro wrestler Ryo Mizunami at Gladiator: Dream, Power and Hope. She defeated Mizunami by submission due to an armbar early in the first round.

She defeated Sugiyama by unanimous decision to become the new Jewels Atomweight queen champion. Following Jewels' closure, Ham's title was renamed the Deep Jewels Atomweight championship. Ham won the fight by unanimous decision.

Ultimate Fighting Championship
In early November 2014 Seo Hee Ham signed a four-fight contract with Ultimate Fighting Championship to join UFC's Strawweight division.  She made her debut against Joanne Calderwood at The Ultimate Fighter: A Champion Will Be Crowned Finale on December 12, 2014. She lost the fight by unanimous decision.

Ham was expected to face Bec Rawlings on May 10, 2015 at UFC Fight Night 65.  However, Ham pulled out of the bout on April 10 and was replaced by Lisa Ellis.

After nearly a year away from the company, Ham returned to face Cortney Casey on November 28, 2015 at UFC Fight Night: Henderson vs. Masvidal.  She won the fight via unanimous decision.  The win also earned Ham her first Fight of the Night bonus award. She lost to Danielle Taylor at UFC Fight Night 101 on Nov. 26, 2016 via split decision and was subsequently released from the promotion.

Road FC
After briefly considering retirement, Ham signed with Road FC where she became the atomweight champion with a victory over Mina Kurobe. On December 23, 2017, she successfully defended her atomweight championship with a first round stoppage over Jinh Yu Frey.

Rizin
On June 21, 2019, it was announced Ham would face former DEEP Champion Tomo Maesawa at Rizin 17 on July 28, 2019. She won the fight by TKO in the first round.

Next, Ham faced Miyuu Yamamoto at Rizin 19 on October 12, 2019. She won the fight via technical knockout in the second round.

With two consecutive victories in Rizin, Ham earned a title shot against Ayaka Hamasaki at Rizin 20 on December 31, 2019. She won the trilogy fight via split decision, becoming the second Rizin Women's Super Atomweight Champion.

Ham vacated her Rizin Atomweight title in October 2020, as she couldn't come to an agreement with Rizin for her next fight.

ONE Championship
After vacating her Rizin Atomweight title, Ham signed with ONE Championship, where she will compete in the atomweight division. She was scheduled to take part in the ONE Atomweight Grand Prix. It was reported that Ham will face Denice Zamboanga in the quarter-final of the ONE Women's Atomweight Grand Prix at ONE Championship: Empower on May 28, 2021. The event was later postponed due to COVID-19 precautions. The event was rescheduled for September 3, 2021. She won the close bout via split decision. Due to the controversy the decision stirred, the bout was placed under review but the ONE Championship committee left the result standing. 

Ham was scheduled to face Stamp Fairtex in the semi-final bout of ONE Women's Atomweight Grand Prix at ONE Championship: Next Generation on October 29, 2021. Ham had to pull out of the bout due to injury and was replaced by alternate bout winner Julie Mezabarba.

Ham was scheduled to rematch Denice Zamboanga at ONE: X on December 5, 2021. Their rematch was later postponed to March 6, 2022. Ham failed the hydration test the day before the fight, and was given until midnight to pass. Ham was able to pass the test in the mandated time and won the fight by unanimous decision.

Ham was scheduled to face Itsuki Hirata at ONE 163 on November 18, 2022. However, Hirata missed weight and failed the hydration test, and the match was scrapped after Ham declined a catchweight bout due to Hirata's history of missing weight. The pair was rescheduled for March 25, 2023, at ONE Fight Night 8.

Kickboxing career 
On , Ham defeated Ayano Oishi in a K-1 rules match by unanimous decision at Japan-South Korea friendship international martial arts tournament Gladiator Okayama tournament.

On , Ham faced Megumi Yabushita for a second time at Gladiator 14: KOK Samurai Series. Ham won the fight by TKO in the second round.

On , Ham entered the 2011 Shoot Boxing Girls S-Cup tournament. She defeated Emi Fujino and Mina in the opening rounds, but lost to Erika Kamimura via unanimous decision in the tournament final.

She was defeated by unanimous decision.

She defeated Lisa Ellis to advance to the semi-final round, but lost to Rena Kubota via unanimous decision.

Championships and accomplishments
CMA/KPW Women's Champion
 CMA/KPW Women's Lightweight Championship (One time) 
 Two successful title defenses
Jewels 
 Jewels Atomweight Championship (One time)
 Two successful title defenses
 Jewels Lightweight Queen Tournament Runner-up 
Ultimate Fighting Championship
Fight of the Night (One time) 
Road Fighting Championship
Road FC Women's Atomweight Championship (one time)
 Two successful title defenses
Rizin Fighting Federation
 Rizin Women's Super Atomweight Championship (one time)

Other activities

Mixed martial arts record

|-
| Win
| align=center| 25–8
| Denice Zamboanga
| Decision (unanimous)
| ONE: X
| 
| align=center| 3
| align=center| 5:00
| Kallang, Singapore
| 
|-
| Win
| align=center| 24–8
| Denice Zamboanga
| Decision (split)
| ONE: Empower
| 
| align=center|3
| align=center|5:00
| Kallang, Singapore
| 
|-
| Win
| align=center| 23–8
| Ayaka Hamasaki
| Decision (split)
| Rizin 20
| 
| align=center| 3
| align=center| 5:00
| Saitama, Japan
| 
|-
| Win
| align=center| 22–8
| Miyuu Yamamoto
| TKO (punches)
| Rizin 19
| 
| align=center| 2
| align=center| 9:42
| Osaka, Japan
|
|-
|Win
|align=center|21–8
|Tomo Maesawa
|TKO (knees)
|Rizin 17
|
|align=center|1
|align=center|3:13
|Saitama, Japan
|
|-
|Win
|align=center|20–8
|Jeong-Eun Park
|Decision (unanimous)
|Road FC 051 XX
|
|align=center|3
|align=center|5:00
|Seoul, South Korea
|
|-
|Win
|align=center|19–8
|Jinh Yu Frey
|TKO (punches)
|Road FC 045 XX
|
|align=center|1
|align=center|4:40
|Seoul, South Korea
|
|-
|Win
|align=center|18–8
|Mina Kurobe
|TKO (punches)
|Road FC 039
|
|align=center|3
|align=center|4:13
|Seoul, South Korea
|
|-
|Loss
|align=center|17–8
|Danielle Taylor
|Decision (split)
|UFC Fight Night: Whittaker vs. Brunson
|
|align=center|3
|align=center|5:00
|Melbourne, Australia
|
|-
|Loss
|align=center|17–7
|Bec Rawlings
|Decision (unanimous)
|UFC Fight Night: Hunt vs. Mir
|
|align=center|3
|align=center|5:00
|Brisbane, Australia
|
|-
|Win
|align=center|17–6
|Cortney Casey
|Decision (unanimous)
|UFC Fight Night: Henderson vs. Masvidal
|
|align=center|3
|align=center|5:00
|Seoul, South Korea
|
|-
| Loss
| align=center| 16–6
| Joanne Calderwood
| Decision (unanimous)
| The Ultimate Fighter: A Champion Will Be Crowned Finale
| 
| align=center| 3
| align=center| 5:00
| Las Vegas, Nevada, United States
| 
|-
| Win
| align=center| 16–5
| Saori Ishioka
| Submission (armbar)
| Deep Jewels 6
| 
| align=center| 2
| align=center| 2:43
| Tokyo, Japan
| 
|-
| Win
| align=center| 15–5
| Alyona Rassohyna
| Decision (unanimous)
| Road FC 018
| 
| align=center| 2
| align=center| 5:00
| Seoul, South Korea
| 
|-
| Win
| align=center| 14–5
| Shino VanHoose
| Decision (unanimous)
| Road FC Korea 003: Korea vs. Brazil
| 
| align=center| 2
| align=center| 5:00
| Seoul, South Korea
| 
|-
| Win
| align=center| 13–5
| Sadae Numata
| Decision (unanimous)
| Deep Jewels 2
| 
| align=center| 3
| align=center| 5:00
| Tokyo, Japan
| 
|-
| Win
| align=center| 12–5
| Naho Sugiyama
| Decision (unanimous)
| Jewels 24th Ring
| 
| align=center| 3
| align=center| 5:00
| Tokyo, Japan
| 
|-
| Win
| align=center| 11–5
| Ryo Mizunami
| Submission (armbar)
| Gladiator: Dream, Power and Hope
| 
| align=center| 1
| align=center| 1:05
| Sapporo, Japan
| 
|-
| Loss
| align=center| 10–5
| Ayaka Hamasaki
| TKO (corner stoppage)
| Jewels 17th Ring
| 
| align=center| 1
| align=center| 5:00
| Tokyo, Japan
| 
|-
| Win
| align=center| 10–4
| Mei Yamaguchi
| Decision (unanimous)
| Jewels 15th Ring
| 
| align=center| 2
| align=center| 5:00
| Tokyo, Japan
| 
|-
| Win
| align=center| 9–4
| Anna Saito
| Decision (unanimous)
| Gladiator 15: GI 2
| 
| align=center| 2
| align=center| 5:00
| Kawasaki, Japan
| 
|-
| Win
| align=center| 8–4
| Saori Ishioka
| Decision (unanimous)
| Deep: 52 Impact
| 
| align=center| 2
| align=center| 5:00
| Tokyo, Japan
| 
|-
| Loss
| align=center| 7–4
| Ayaka Hamasaki
| Decision (unanimous)
| Jewels 11th Ring
| 
| align=center| 2
| align=center| 5:00
| Tokyo, Japan
| 
|-
| Win
| align=center| 7–3
| Mika Nagano
| Decision (split)
| Jewels 11th Ring
| 
| align=center| 2
| align=center| 5:00
| Tokyo, Japan
| 
|-
| Win
| align=center| 6–3
| Mai Ichii
| Decision (unanimous)
| Jewels 9th Ring
| 
| align=center| 2
| align=center| 5:00
| Tokyo, Japan
| 
|-
| Win
| align=center| 5–3
| Misaki Takimoto
| Decision (unanimous)
| Jewels 5th Ring
| 
| align=center| 2
| align=center| 5:00
| Tokyo, Japan
| 
|-
| Loss
| align=center| 4–3
| Megumi Fujii
| Submission (armbar)
| Smackgirl - World ReMix Tournament 2008 Second Round
| 
| align=center| 1
| align=center| 3:39
| Tokyo, Japan
| 
|-
| Win
| align=center| 4–2
| Saori Ishioka
| Decision (unanimous)
| Smackgirl - World ReMix Tournament 2008 Opening Round
| 
| align=center| 2
| align=center| 5:00
| Tokyo, Japan
| 
|-
| Loss
| align=center| 3–2
| Yuka Tsuji
| Decision (unanimous)
| Smackgirl 7th Anniversary: Starting Over
| 
| align=center| 3
| align=center| 5:00
| Tokyo, Japan
| 
|-
| Win
| align=center| 3–1
| Amantiva Golbahar
| Submission (rear-naked choke)
| X-Impact World Cup
| 
| align=center| 1
| align=center| 0:10
| Suwon, South Korea
| 
|-
| Win
| align=center| 2–1
| Ayumi Saito
| Decision (unanimous)
| Smackgirl 2007: Queens' Hottest Summer
| 
| align=center| 2
| align=center| 5:00
| Tokyo, Japan
| 
|-
| Loss
| align=center| 1–1
| Miku Matsumoto
| Submission (triangle choke)
| Deep: clubDeep Toyama: Barbarian Festival 6
| 
| align=center| 2
| align=center| 3:44
| Toyama, Japan
| 
|-
| Win
| align=center| 1–0
| Hisae Watanabe
| Decision (unanimous)
| Deep: 28 Impact
| 
| align=center| 2
| align=center| 5:00
| Tokyo, Japan
|

Kickboxing record

Legend:

See also
 List of current ONE fighters
 List of female mixed martial artists
 List of female kickboxers

References

External links
 Ham Seo Hee at ONE
 
 
 Seo Hee Ham at Awakening Fighters
 Profile at Deep 
 Official blog 

1987 births
Living people
South Korean female kickboxers
South Korean female mixed martial artists
Atomweight mixed martial artists
Strawweight mixed martial artists
Mixed martial artists utilizing kickboxing
Mixed martial artists utilizing shootboxing
Road Fighting Championship champions
Sportspeople from Gangwon Province, South Korea
Ultimate Fighting Championship female fighters
Mixed martial arts champions